Shiva Kabul F.C. is a football team in Afghanistan. They play in the Afghan Premier League.

Current squad 
Freikun Rasuli [Sri Lanka] 1 GK
Ibrahim Shadikun Zhorkhak [Afghanistan] 2 Def
Samwig Mohayad [Afghanistan] 3 Mid
Nangalei Kharsikuni [France] 7 Mid
Khabdul Assyam [Afghanistan] 8 Mid
Amir Mocksin Zackaria [Indonesia] 12 GK
Fadye Abbas [Camaroun] 17 Forward
Sabry Al-Kankone [Kuwaiti] 25 GK
Samar Basoud [Afghanistan] 49 Def
Bardi Abdulla [Qatar] 73 Mid
Ady Samia [Egypt] -- UNK
Sakler [UNK?] -- UNT
Football clubs in Afghanistan
Sport in Kabul